Pehuenches is a department located in the west of Neuquén Province, Argentina.

Geography 

The Department is surrounded by Loncopué Department in the north, Confluencia Department in the northeast, Zapala Department in the southwest, Catán Lil Department in the south, Aluminé Department in the southwest and Chile in the west.

Departments of Neuquén Province